Klášterec nad Orlicí is a municipality and village in Ústí nad Orlicí District in the Pardubice Region of the Czech Republic. It has about 900 inhabitants.

Administrative parts
Villages of Čihák, Jedlina, Lhotka and Zbudov are administrative parts of Klášterec nad Orlicí.

Etymology
The name klášterec (from klášter, i.e. "monastery") refers to a small fortified monastery, which used to stand here when the village was founded.

Geography

It lies in the Orlické Mountains.
The Divoká Orlice river flows through the municipality.

History
Klášterec nad Orlicí was most likely founded before 1280. The first written mention of the village is in a document of bishop Tobiáš of Bechyně from the period between 1279 and 1290, in which he praises the intention to build a monastery in this landscape. The next mention is in the bull of Pope Boniface VIII from 1295. The village was originally formed by two parts named Orlík and Orlička, the name Klášterec first appeared after 1395.

Sights

The Church of the Holy Trinity is a valuable example of a rural church. It was founded at the end of the 13th century and rebuilt in the late Gothic style in 1452–1453. Later it was modified in Renaissance and Baroque styles. The church complex also includes a late Baroque ossuary from 1793, enclosure wall, and Calvary from 1799.

References

External links

Villages in Ústí nad Orlicí District